Clubul Sportiv Municipal Fetești, commonly known as CSM Fetești, or simply as Fetești is a Romanian football club based in Fetești, Ialomița County and currently playing in the Liga IV, the fourth tier of the Romanian football league system.

History
Rapid Fetești was founded in 1945 under the name of Locomotiva CFR Fetești at the initiative of a large number of workers from the Fetești Railway Complex, with a love of sports, among which we can mention Oprea Cojocaru, Petre Ion, Ștefan Iacob.
In the meantime other teams appear in the city,  Progresul (town hall team), Ogorul (IAS), Autobuzul (IRTA) which played in the lower categories. Progresul and Ogorul merged and thus a new team called Viticola appears.
In the summer of 1972, after Viticola lost the promotion play-off in Divizia C, the two leading clubs of the city, Viticola and Locomotiva CFR decided to merge to give Fetești a stronger club and formed a new entity, Rapid Fetești.

In their first season manages to won the County Championship and promotes in Divizia C, where they will play for the next three seasons. After finished 10th in 1973–74 season and 9th in 1974–75 season, the club were relegated back to the Fourth Division after 1975–76 season when was ranked 16th.

Rapid Fetești were promoted back in Divizia C after 1978–79 season. Feteștenii spent the next six seasons in the third division in which were ranked as follows:  12th in 1979–80, 5th in 1980–81, 3rd in 1981–82, 10th in 1982–83, 8th in 1983–84 and 15th 1984–85 when relegated. The third place obtained in 1982 will be the best performance in the history of the club. 

The club managed to return in Divizia C in 1989, but again without notable results: Narrowly avoiding relegation in 1989–90 season, ranked 14th of 16, 11th in 1990–91, and relegated at the end of the 1991–92 season when finished 15th.

Another comeback was made in 1993, but after a 13th place in 1993–94 season, in the next season, due to the withdrawal of main sponsor, Elcom, the club faces great financial difficulties and after only nine rounds withdraws from Divizia C.

From 1994 to 2002, Rapid Fetești had become a regular top-half table finisher in the Fourth Division. The 2001–02 season saw Rapid again won Divizia D – Ialomița County for a fifth time, but lost the promotion play-off against Turistul Pietroasa Haleș, the champion of Divizia D – Buzău County, 1–4 at Strejnic.

After a long spell in the fourth league, eighteen seasons, following a successful 2011–12 campaign, the team succeeded to promote in Liga III, winning Liga IV – Ialomița County and the promotion play-off against champion of Liga IV – Brăila County, Victoria Traian, 3–0 on penalties, on neutral ground at Berca.

In 2012–13, Rapid endured a difficult season in the third tier, finishing in 9th place and was saved from relegation only because the withdrawal of other teams. However, the following season (2013–14) saw another relegation, feteștenii finishing on 11th place of 12.

In the next season, 2014–15, due to financial difficulties, Rapid Fetești enrolled in  Liga V – Ialomița County, the fifth tier of Romanian football, achieving an instant promotion in the fourth league, without any defeat.

Returned to Liga IV,  Rapid Fetești, managed two seasons in a row to finish 3rd (2015–16 and 2016–17) before withdrew for financial reasons at the end of the first part of the 2017–18 season lost in return all the matches with 0–3 according to the regulations and ranked 14th. 

In the summer of 2018, the Fetești municipality founded a new club, Clubul Sportiv Municipal Fetești, but it does not have the record of the Rapid Fetești team.
 
At the beginning of 2018–19 season, CSM Fetești bought the place in Liga IV of the newly promoted Fulgerul Fierbinți, finishing the championship on the 9th place.

The 2019–20 season was suspended in March 2020 due to the COVID-19 pandemic in Romania, the team from Fetești being at that time on 10th place.

Managed by Mircea Ștefan, CSM Fetești won the 2020–21 Liga IV – Ialomița County short tournament and the promotion/relegation play-off, on the away goal rule, against Liga III side CS Făurei (2–2 at Fǎurei and 0–0 at Fetești), returning to Third Division after seven years of absence. However, "Feteștenii", were relegated at the end of the following season ranking ninth in Series III of Liga III.

Honours
Liga IV – Ialomița County
Winners (10): 1972–73, 1977–78, 1978–79, 1985–86, 1987–88, 1988–89, 1992–93, 2001–02, 2011–12, 2020–21
 Runners-up (1): 1970–71
Liga V – Ialomița County
Winners (1): 2014–15

Cupa României – Ialomița County
Winners (1): 2001–02

Other performances
 Appearances in Liga III: 17
 Best finish in Liga III: 3rd (1981–82)

League history

References

External links

Football clubs in Ialomița County
Association football clubs established in 1945
Liga III clubs
Liga IV clubs
1945 establishments in Romania